is a Japanese master of Shotokan karate.  He has  won the JKA All-Japan championships for kata. He is currently an instructor of the Japan Karate Association.

Biography

Seizo Izumiya was born in Hokkaido, Japan on 12 October 1961. He studied at Komazawa University. His karate training began during his 1st year of junior high school.

Competition
Seizo Izumiya has had considerable success in karate competition.

Major Tournament Success
8th Shoto World Cup Karate Championship Tournament (Tokyo, 2000) - 2nd Place Kata
43rd JKA All Japan Karate Championship (2000) - 2nd Place Kata
42nd JKA All Japan Karate Championship (1999) - 2nd Place Kata
41st JKA All Japan Karate Championship (1998) - 2nd Place Kata
7th Shoto World Cup Karate Championship Tournament (Paris, 1998) - 2nd Place Kata
40th JKA All Japan Karate Championship (1997)  - Tournament Grand Champion; 1st Place Kata; 2nd Place Kumite
37th JKA All Japan Karate Championship (1994) - 3rd Place Kumite

References

 

1961 births
Japanese male karateka
Karate coaches
Shotokan practitioners
Sportspeople from Hokkaido
Komazawa University alumni
Living people